Mark Kevin Carnevale (born May 21, 1960) is an American professional golfer and commentator for PGA Tour Radio.

Carnevale was born in Annapolis, Maryland, where his father, Ben, was the head basketball coach at the United States Naval Academy. He attended Lafayette High School in Williamsburg, Virginia, and later was a standout golfer at James Madison University. He turned professional in 1983.

It took Carnevale almost a decade to reach the top level, but in 1992 he won the PGA Tour's Chattanooga Classic and was the PGA Tour Rookie of the Year; however, he never established himself as a regular high finisher at the elite level. He spent time on the second tier tour, where he won the 1997 Nike Inland Empire Open.

In 2003, he became tournament director of the Nationwide Tour's Virginia Beach Open. After turning 50 in May 2010, Carnevale began play in a limited number of events on the Champions Tour.

Professional wins (4)

PGA Tour wins (1)

PGA Tour playoff record (0–1)

Nike Tour wins (1)

Other wins (2)
1984 Virginia Open
1990 Utah Open

Results in major championships

Note: Carnevale never played in The Open Championship.

CUT = missed the half-way cut
"T" = tied

See also
1991 PGA Tour Qualifying School graduates
1997 Nike Tour graduates

References

External links

American male golfers
PGA Tour golfers
Golf writers and broadcasters
Korn Ferry Tour graduates
Golfers from Maryland
Golfers from Virginia
James Madison Dukes athletes
Sportspeople from Annapolis, Maryland
Sportspeople from Williamsburg, Virginia
1960 births
Living people